Stephen Quirke  (born 1992) is an Irish hurler who plays for Offaly Senior Championship club St. Rynagh's. He is a former member of the Offaly senior hurling team, with whom he usually lined out as a forward.

Career

Quirke first came to prominence at juvenile and underage levels with the St. Rynagh's club in Banagher. He eventually joined the club's senior team and has since won two County Championship titles. Quirke first appeared on the inter-county scene during a two-year stint with the Offaly minor team, before later lining out with the under-21 team. He also played with University College Dublin in the Fitzgibbon Cup. Quirke joined the Offaly senior hurling team in 2014 and continued to line out until leaving the panel in 2017.

Honours

St. Rynagh's
Offaly Senior Hurling Championship: 2016, 2019

References

1992 births
Living people
UCD hurlers
St Rynagh's hurlers
Offaly inter-county hurlers